Rasika Productions is an Indian Marathi play production and distribution company based in Mumbai as part of the Marathi theatre industry. The company was founded by Mukta Barve in 2013.

History
Mukta Barve who impressed her fans through her performances in plays, television and films, debuted as a producer in Marathi theatre with her production house named after late actress Rasika Joshi. Barve's first production as a producer was the play titled Chhapa Kata, which saw her play the lead role along with veteran actress Reema Lagoo. According to Barve, this production house is her tribute to her friendship with Rasika. Later she produced two plays Lovebirds (2015), Indira (2015) and Rang Nava (2014), a poetry based theatre program.

Productions

References

Indian companies established in 2013
Companies based in Mumbai
2013 establishments in Maharashtra